The Al Massira Dam is a gravity dam located  south of Settat on the Oum Er-Rbia River in Settat Province, Morocco. The dam's hydroelectric power plant also generates  on average annually. The power station was commissioned in 1980. Just to the north of the dam is a rip rap saddle dam to support water elevation in the reservoir. The dam's reservoir and wetlands were designated as a Ramsar site in 2005.

See also

Mohamed V Dam – another Ramsar site in Morocco
 List of power stations in Morocco

References

Dams completed in 1979
Energy infrastructure completed in 1980
Dams in Morocco
Gravity dams
Hydroelectric power stations in Morocco
Ramsar sites in Morocco
Buildings and structures in Casablanca-Settat
20th-century architecture in Morocco